Margery Hill  is a  hill on the Howden Moors in South Yorkshire, England. It lies towards the northern boundary of the Peak District National Park, between Langsett Reservoir to the northeast and Howden Reservoir to the southwest. The area is managed by the National Trust as part of their High Peak Estate.

Peat near the summit cairn has been dated to a uniform age of about 3,500 years old, indicating that it was constructed rather than natural; it is believed to have been part of a Bronze Age burial mound. The area has been designated a Scheduled Ancient Monument by English Heritage.

Margery Hill is the highest marked point within the boundaries of the City of Sheffield.

References

External links
 The Central Archaeology Service, fieldwork projects: Margery Hill, South Yorkshire

Mountains and hills of the Peak District
National Trust properties in South Yorkshire
Hills and edges of South Yorkshire
Geography of Sheffield
Scheduled monuments in South Yorkshire
Archaeological sites in South Yorkshire